Endromidae is a family of moths. It was long considered to be a monotypic family, containing just one species, the Kentish glory, Endromis versicolora, found throughout the Palaearctic region . The family now consists of several genera and about 30 species, all former members of the family Bombycidae.

Genera
Andraca Walker, 1865
Dalailama Staudinger, 1896
Endromis Ochsenheimer, 1810
Falcogona Zolotuhin, 2007
Mirina Staudinger, 1892
Mustilia Walker, 1865
Mustilizans J.K. Yang, 1995
Oberthueria Kirby, 1892
Prismosticta Butler, 1880
Prismostictoides Zolotuhin & T.T. Du, 2011
Pseudandraca Miyata, 1970
Sesquiluna Forbes, 1955

External links
Description and pictures
Increased gene sampling yields robust support for higher-level clades within Bombycoidea (Lepidoptera)

 
Moth families